"Fire (Yes, Yes Y'all)" (simply known as "Fire") is a song by American rapper Joe Budden featuring Busta Rhymes. Produced by Just Blaze, the song is the second single from Budden's 2003 eponymous debut album.

The song was featured in the film Mean Girls and the pilot episode of Entourage. Joe Budden had made a remix with Paul Cain and Fabolous which appeared on the latter's mixtape, "More Street Dreams, Pt. 2: The Mixtape".

Track listing
12" Vinyl

Credits
Recording
Recorded at Record One, Los Angeles, California for N.Q.C. Management.
Redman's vocals recorded at Enterprise Studios, Los Angeles, California.
Mixed at Right Track Studios, New York City for Loreal, Inc.

Personnel
Just Blaze – producer
Envyi – vocals [additional]
Busta Rhymes – featured artist
Pat Viala – mixing
Ryan West – engineer
Wassim Zreik – engineer [Redman's verse]

Charts

References

2003 songs
2003 singles
Joe Budden songs
Busta Rhymes songs
Song recordings produced by Just Blaze
Songs written by Busta Rhymes
Songs written by Just Blaze
Songs written by Joe Budden
Def Jam Recordings singles